Valentano is a town and comune of the province of Viterbo, in the Lazio region of central Italy.

The placename is of uncertain origin. Some identify the town with an Etruscan Verentum, others trace the name to ontano, Italian for alder, since alders cover the slopes of a nearby valley: Valle Ontano becoming Valentano.

History

Antiquity and High Middle Ages
The town is named for the first time in a manuscript of 813 in the Farfa Register; starting in 844 a "Balentanu" appears in other documents of the abbey of San Salvatore on Mt. Amiata. The land was definitely inhabited in prehistoric times, and important finds in the Lake Mezzano and near Mt. Becco, Mt. Saliette, the Poggi del Mulino and Mt. Starnina seem to confirm the theories of historians, who identify the lake with the Lake of Statonia (Lacus Statoniensis) described by Seneca in his Naturales Quaestiones and by Pliny the Elder (ii.209, xiv.67 and xxxvi.168).

The Farnese
In the Renaissance period, the town fell under the dominion of the Farnese family: it is to them that Valentano owes its fortress (Rocca) and many of its churches.

In 1649, when the town of Castro, capital of the Duchy of Castro, was destroyed, Valentano became the natural center of the Castrense region and the custodian of its archives.

Modern times
In June 1944, an artillery shell exploded in the "Portonaccio" gate, killing seven civilians who had taken shelter in it. The gate itself is a witness to the tragedy, since one of its stones is missing, but in 2004 a plaque was placed in the Via Trento e Trieste to commemorate all local victims of World War II.

Main sights
 Palazzo Comunale (Town Hall)
 Porta Magenta, designed by Vignola
 Vitozzi Palace
 Cruciani Palace, birthplace of Paolo Ruffini
 San Martino lookout
 Museum of the Prehistory of Tuscia and of the Rocca Farnese
 Churches:
 Collegiate church of San Giovanni Evangelista
 Santa Maria
 Santa Croce
 Madonna del Monte
 Sanctuary of the Madonna della Salute  
 Chiesa dell'Annunziata at Villa Fontane
 Sancta Maria ad Templum
 Chiesa dell'Eschio '''
 Church of the Madonna della Pietà (also Madonna dell' Ospedale'')

People
 Ranuccio Farnese, Roman Catholic cardinal
 Alessandro Guarnelli 
 Paolo Ruffini, 18th century mathematician

Events
 Good Friday: Procession of the Body of Christ ("Cristo Morto")
 Third Sunday in May: Cedar Fair, instituted by the Farnese in 1461
 August 14–15 Agosto: Feast of the Assumption, with a Plowing Competition.
 Throughout the summer: various events, including the Palio of the Duchy of Castro, a historical pageant.

Twin towns
 Haltwhistle, United Kingdom
 Saint-Méen-le-Grand, France

References

External links 

 
Valentano.Org
ProLoco Valentano (Tourist Office)
George Dennis on Valentano

Cities and towns in Lazio
Castles in Italy